Monja Danischewsky (28 April 1911 – 16 October 1994) was a British producer and writer, born in Archangel into a Russian-Jewish family who left Russia for England in 1919 and who produced and wrote the films Topkapi and Rockets Galore! (1957)  and others.

Biography

Early life
Monja Danischewsky's family left Russia for Great Britain in 1919.

Career
He started out with various publicity jobs, then to Ealing Studios as publicity director in 1938 and occasional writer. Switched to producer 1949; became independent producer The Galloping Major (1951); returned as producer/writer in mid-1950s and continued briefly after Ealing ended; Rockets Galore (1958) and The Battle of the Sexes (1959). Autobiography, 'White Russian, Red Face', 1966.

Filmography

As writer
Undercover (1943)
Bitter Springs (1950)
The Galloping Major (1951) 
Meet Mr. Lucifer (1953)
The Love Lottery (1954) (additional dialogue and scenes)
Rockets Galore! (1957) 
The Battle of the Sexes (1959) 
Two and Two Make Six (1962)
Topkapi (1964) (screenplay) 
Mister Moses (1965)
Avalanche (1969) (as John Danischewsky)
That Lucky Touch (1975) (adaptation)

As producer
Whisky Galore! (1949) (associate producer)
The Galloping Major (1951)
Meet Mr. Lucifer (1953)
The Love Lottery (1954)
The Battle of the Sexes (1959)
Two and Two Make Six (1962) (producer)
Avalanche (1969) (producer) (as John Danischewsky)
Run Wild, Run Freedom (1969)

Published works
White Russian, Red Face (Gollancz, 1966)
Out of My Mind (Michael Joseph, 1972)
 short memoir by Danischewsky of Barnett Freedman, in Emma Mason (ed.), Tales of Barnett Freedman (Bread and Butter Press, 2020)

References

External links

1911 births
1994 deaths
English film producers
White Russian emigrants to the United Kingdom
Russian Jews
20th-century English screenwriters
20th-century English businesspeople